As of January 2018, the Azerbaijani low-cost virtual carrier Buta Airways serves the following destinations:

Current destinations

Terminated destinations

References

External links 
 Buta Airways official website

Buta Airways